Dance Preludes was a ballet made by Miriam Mahdaviani of New York City Ballet to Witold Lutosławski's 1955 music as a pièce d'occasion for the Dancers' Emergency Fund Benefit on 24 February 1991 at the New York State Theater, Lincoln Center. The program also included George Balanchine's Serenade, the pas de deux from his Theme and Variations, Robert La Fosse's Gretry Pas de Deux, Sean Lavery's Romeo and Juliet, Alexandre Proia's Salome Dances for Peace, and ended with Balanchine's Stars and Stripes.

Original cast 

Wendy Whelan
Albert Evans

Reviews 
NY Times review by Anna Kisselgoff, February 26, 1991

References

Ballets by Miriam Mahdaviani
Ballets to the music of Witold Lutoslawski
1991 ballet premieres
New York City Ballet repertory